Nikos Arabatzis (Greek: Νίκος Αραμπατζής; born 10 March 1984) is a Greek footballer currently playing for  AEL 1964 in Gamma Ethniki. He usually plays as a right defender but past coaches have also used him as a right midfielder, making him a modern full-back. He is known for his pace and crossing.

While still in Panserraikos he became member of the Greece national under-21 football team.

In the 2006 winter transfer window he was bought by PAOK FC and has made an instant impact. He attracted the interest of AEK Athens but the bid of 900.000 euros was rejected to the delight of PAOK fans. He was unlucky, as he had a serious knee injury in the summer of 2007 and had to undergo surgery, for the second time in his career in his right knee. He didn't manage to take part in any game of the 2007–8 season.

On August 2, 2010, he signed a two-year contract with Iraklis. Then, in August 2011 after good performances, he signed with AEL 1964. In summer 2012 he tried his luck in Cyprus with Ethnikos Achnas where he had a successful season start. Later,  In January 2013, he signed a 6-month contract with Panetolikos, helping the team gain the promotion to the Greek Superleague. In August 2013, he returned once more to  AEL 1964.

References

External links
 

1984 births
Living people
People from Kapetan Mitrousi
Greek footballers
Greece youth international footballers
Greece under-21 international footballers
PAOK FC players
Iraklis Thessaloniki F.C. players
Panserraikos F.C. players
Athlitiki Enosi Larissa F.C. players
Ethnikos Achna FC players
Panetolikos F.C. players
Super League Greece players
Cypriot First Division players
Greek expatriate footballers
Expatriate footballers in Cyprus
Association football fullbacks
Footballers from Central Macedonia